Sureh Chum (also Romanized as Sūreh Chūm; also known as Sūreh Cham) is a village in Baryaji Rural District, in the Central District of Sardasht County, West Azerbaijan Province, Iran. At the 2006 census, its population was 123, in 27 families.

References 

Populated places in Sardasht County